The Delhi rock gecko (Cyrtopodion aravallensis) is a species of gecko, a lizard in the family Gekkonidae. The species is endemic to northern India.

Geographic range
C. aravallensis is found in the Delhi Ridge in India.

Taxonomy
Cyrtopodion aravallensis  was originally described in the genus Cyrtodactylus.

References

Cyrtopodion
Reptiles described in 1997
Lizards of Asia
Reptiles of India